Feel Something may refer to:
 Feel Something (Movements album)
 Feel Something (The History of Apple Pie album)
 "Feel Something" (Bea Miller song)
 "Feel Something" (Armin van Buuren song)
 "Feel Something" (Illenium, Excision and I Prevail song)
 "Feel Something", a song by Adam Lambert from the album Velvet
 Feel Something, a 2017 album by Jaymes Young